Shafqat Mahmood (Punjabi, ; 19 February 1950) is a Pakistani bureaucrat-turned-politician who served as the Federal Minister for Federal Education and Professional Training, and Federal Minister for National History and Literary Heritage, from 20 August 2018 to 3 April 2022. Before going into politics, he served as a grade 20 officer of the Pakistan Administrative Service.

He was elected a member of the National Assembly of Pakistan in 2013 and 2018. He has been a member of the Senate of Pakistan from March 1994 to March 2000. He served as Federal Minister for the Ministry of Food, Agriculture and Livestock, the Ministry of Environment, Urban Affair Forestry and Wildlife, and the Ministry of Local Government and Rural Development in the federal cabinet of Prime Minister Malik Meraj Khalid from November 1996 to February 1997. He served as Provincial Minister of Punjab for Information from 1999 to 2000 during the military rule of Pervez Musharraf. He is no longer Member of the National Assembly as he resigned from the National Assembly.

Early life and education
He was born on 19 February 1950.  He completed his early education at Sadiq Public School, Bahawalpur,
and later studied in the Government College University, Lahore before completing his Certificate of Merit from the University of the Punjab in 1970. He received a Masters in Psychology, and Masters in Public Administration from Harvard University in 1981. He obtained a Masters in Public Policy and Administration from the University of Southern California in 1987.

Early career
He started his career by joining the Pakistan Administrative Service cadre of the civil bureaucracy in 1973. He served as Assistant Commissioner of Murree and Pakpatan from 1975 to 1978. He was then made Deputy Secretary to the Government of the Punjab where he served till 1980. He served as Deputy Commissioner of Gujranwala and Dera Ghazi Khan for five years and also as an Additional Commissioner of the Afghan Refugees Organization for a short time in 1985. He served as Additional Secretary of Finance of the Government of Punjab from 1988 to 1989. Later, he joined the Prime Minister's Secretariat and served as Joint Secretary from 1989 to 1990.

Political career

He left the civil service and joined the Pakistan Peoples Party (PPP) in 1990 to begin his political career. He was appointed as political secretary to then Prime Minister of Pakistan Benazir Bhutto and remained spokesperson for PPP to represent the party on foreign tours. He remained a close aide of Zulfikar Ali Bhutto and of Benazir Bhutto.

He was elected to the Senate of Pakistan as a candidate of PPP from Islamabad in March 1994. He was re-elected to the Senate as an independent candidate from Islamabad in March 1997. He remained a member of the Senate until March 2000.

On 5 November 1996, he was inducted into the federal cabinet of caretaker Prime Minister Malik Meraj Khalid and was appointed as Federal Minister for Food, Agriculture and Livestock. On 12 November, he was given the additional ministerial portfolio of Ministry of Environment, Urban Affair Forestry and Wildlife. On 25 November, he was given the additional ministerial portfolio of  Ministry of Environment, Local Government and Rural Development. He served as Minister for Food, Agriculture and Livestock until 15 December 1996. He remained Minister for Environment, Urban Affair Forestry and Wildlife, and Minister for Environment, Local Government and Rural Development until 17 February 1997.

He became part of the military government setup following the 1999 Pakistani coup d'état and served as Provincial Minister of Punjab for Information from 1999 to 2000. After his resignation, he began writing columns for an English-language newspaper The News International and used to criticize the Pakistan Tehreek-e-Insaf (PTI) and its chief Imran Khan.

After the assassination of Benazir Bhutto, he quit PPP. He joined PTI in November 2011 and served as information secretary of PTI from December 2011 to March 2013.

He was elected to the National Assembly of Pakistan from Constituency NA-126 (Lahore-IX) as a candidate of PTI in the 2013 Pakistani general election. He received 97,933 votes and defeated Khawaja Ahmad Hassan, a candidate of the Pakistan Muslim League (N) (PML-N).

In November 2015, he resigned from the post of PTI organizer in Lahore after the party's poor performance in local government elections held in October 2015. In May 2017, he became central information secretary of PTI.

He was re-elected to the National Assembly as a candidate of PTI from Constituency NA-130 (Lahore-VIII) in the 2018 Pakistani general election.

On 18 August, Imran Khan formally announced his federal cabinet structure and Mahmood was named as Minister for Federal Education and Professional Training and Minister for National History and Literary Heritage. On 20 August 2018, he was sworn in as a Federal Minister in the federal cabinet of Prime Minister Imran Khan.

On 15 November 2019, he was elected as the President of UNESCO's Education Commission.

References 

Living people
1950 births
Pakistani civil servants
Pakistani columnists
Pakistani MNAs 2013–2018
Pakistani MNAs 2018–2023
Members of the Senate of Pakistan
Pakistan Tehreek-e-Insaf politicians
Pakistan Tehreek-e-Insaf MNAs
Federal ministers of Pakistan
Politicians from Lahore
Punjabi people
Harvard University alumni
University of Southern California alumni
Government College University, Lahore alumni
Sadiq Public School alumni